Galloper could refer to:

 Hyundai Galloper, an SUV manufactured between 1991 and 2003
 Another name for carousel
 Galloper gun, an artillery used circa 1740 in British colonies
 An obsolete term for aide-de-camp

See also
 Galloper Santamo, a licensed Mitsubishi Chariot minivan